The Scythian kingdom in West Asia (Akkadian:  ,  ;;;) was a kingdom created by the Scythians during the 7th–6th centuries BC in West Asia.

The Scythian polity in West Asia was formed as a result of the migration of the Scythians, an ancient Iranic people, from Central Asia into the Caucasian Steppe during the 9th to 8th centuries BC, after which the Scythians expanded southwards, and in the 7th century BC crossed the Caucasus Mountains and settled in Transcaucasia, with their presence to the south of the Caucasus Mountains being an extension of their kingdom of the steppes.

Beginning in the 670s BC, the Scythians allied with the superpower in West Asia, the Neo-Assyrian Empire, thanks to which Scythian power in the region grew to encompass a large territory ranging from central Anatolia in the west to Media in the east. After the Neo-Assyrian Empire started crumbling in the 620s BC, the Scythians were expelled from West Asia by the Medes, after which they retreated into the Pontic Steppe, where they consolidated into the Pontic Scythian kingdom.

The period of presence in West Asia would have a profound influence on the Scythians, and the influence of West Asian cultures would be crucial for the development of Scythian culture and art, while the activities of the Scythians in the region would have profound effects on the political arrangement of West Asia.

History

Origins
In the 8th and 7th centuries BC, a significant movement of the nomads of the Eurasian steppe brought the Scythians into Southwest Asia. This movement started when another nomadic Iranian tribe closely related to the Scythians, either the Massagetae or the Issedones, migrated westwards, forcing the Early Scythians of the to the west across the Araxes river, following which the Scythians moved into the Caspian Steppe, where they assimilated most of the Cimmerians, who were also a nomadic Iranian people closely related to the Scythians, and conquered their territory while displacing the rest of that people.

Under Scythian pressure, the displaced Cimmerians migrated to the south along the coast of the Black Sea and reached Anatolia, and the Scythians in turn later expanded to the south, following the coast of the Caspian Sea and arrived in the Ciscaucasian steppes, from where they expanded into the region to the south of the Kuros river in what is present-day Azerbaijan, where they settled around what is today Mingəçevir, Gəncə and the Muğan plain, and turned eastern Transcaucasia into their centre of operations in West Asia until the early 6th century BC, with this presence in West Asia being an extension of the Scythian kingdom of the steppes. During this period, the Scythian kings' headquarters were located in the Ciscaucasian steppes, and this presence in Transcaucasia influenced Scythian culture: the  sword and socketed bronze arrowheads with three edges, which are considered as typically "Scythian weapons," were of Transcaucasian origin and had been adopted by the Scythians during their stay in the Caucasus; further contacts with the civilisation of West Asia, and especially with that of Mesopotamia, would also have an important influence on the formation of Scythian culture. The earliest Scythians had belonged to the Srubnaya culture, and, archaeologically, the Scythian movement into Transcaucasia is attested in the form of a migration of a section of the Srubnaya culture to the south along the western coast of the Caspian Sea.

The inroads of the Cimmerians and the Scythians into West Asia over the course of the 8th to 6th centuries BC would destabilise the political balance which had prevailed in the region between the states of Assyria, Urartu, Mannaea and Elam on one side and the mountain and tribal peoples on the other.

Rise
During the earliest phase of their presence in West Asia, the Scythians were allied with the Cimmerians, and the two groups, in alliance with the Medes, who were an Iranian people of West Asia to whom the Scythians and Cimmerians were distantly related, were threatening the eastern frontier of the kingdom of Urartu during the reign of its king Argishti II, who reigned from 714 to 680 BC. Argishti II's successor, Rusa II, built several fortresses in the east of Urartu's territory, including that of Teishebaini, to monitor and repel attacks by the Cimmerians, the Mannaeans, the Medes, and the Scythians.

The first mention of the Scythians in the records of the then superpower of West Asia, the Neo-Assyrian Empire, is from between 680/679 and 678/677 BC, when their king Išpakaia joined an alliance with the Mannaeans and the Cimmerians in an attack on the Neo-Assyrian Empire. During this time, the Scythians under Išpakaia, allied to Rusa II of Urartu, were raiding far in the south till the Assyrian province of Zamua. These allied forces were defeated by the Assyrian king Esarhaddon.

The Mannaeans, in alliance with an eastern group of the Cimmerians who had migrated into the Iranian plateau and with the Scythians (the latter of whom attacked the borderlands of Assyria from across the territory of the kingdom of Ḫubuškia), were able to expand their territories at the expense of Assyria and capture the fortresses of Šarru-iqbi and Dūr-Ellil. Negotiations between the Assyrians and the Cimmerians appeared to have followed, according to which the Cimmerians promised not to interfere in the relations between Assyria and Mannai, although a Babylonian diviner in Assyrian service warned Esarhaddon not to trust either the Mannaeans or the Cimmerians and advised him to spy on both of them. In 676 BC, Esarhaddon responded by carrying out a military campaign against Mannai during which he killed Išpakaia. Išpakaia was succeeded by Bartatua, who might have been his son.

In the later mid-670s BC, in alliance with the eastern Cimmerians, the Scythians were menacing the Assyrian provinces of Parsumaš and Bīt Ḫamban, and these joint Cimmerian-Scythian forces together were threatening communication between the Assyrian Empire and its vassal of Ḫubuškia. The Mannaeans, eastern Cimmerians and Medes soon joined a grand coalition headed by the Median chieftain Kashtariti.

Alliance with Assyria
However, the Assyrians had started negotiations with Bartatua immediately after Išpakaia's death, and by 674 BC the Assyrians had been able to defeat Kashtariti, after which his coalition disintegrated. In 672 BC Bartatua asked for the hand of Esarhaddon's daughter Serua-eterat in marriage, which is attested in Esarhaddon's questions to the oracle of the Sun-god Šamaš. Whether this marriage did happen is not recorded in the Assyrian texts, but the close alliance between the Scythians and Assyria under the reigns of Bartatua and his son and successor Madyes suggess that the Assyrian priests did approve of this marriage between a daughter of an Assyrian king and a nomadic lord, which had never happened before in Assyrian history; thus, the Scythians were separated from the Medes and were brought into a marital alliance with Assyria, and Serua-eterat was likely the mother of Bartatua's son Madyes.

Bartatua's marriage to Serua-eterat required that he would pledge allegiance to Assyria as a vassal, and in accordance to Assyrian law, the territories ruled by him would be his fief granted by the Assyrian king, which made the Scythian presence in West Asia a nominal extension of the Neo-Assyrian Empire and Bartatua himself an Assyrian viceroy. Under this arrangement, the power of the Scythians in West Asia heavily depended on their cooperation with the Assyrian Empire; henceforth, the Scythians remained allies of the Assyrian Empire. Around this time, the Urartian king Rusa II might also have enlisted Scythian troops to guard his western borderlands.

The marital alliance between the Scythian king and the Assyrian ruling dynasty, as well as the proximity of the Scythians with the Assyrian-influenced Mannai and Urartu, placed the Scythians under the strong influence of Assyrian culture.

Conquest of Mannai

Over the course of 660 to 659 BC, Esarhaddon's son and successor to the Assyrian throne, Ashurbanipal, sent his general Nabû-šar-uṣur to carry out a military campaign against Mannai. After trying in vain to stop the Assyrian advance, the Mannaean king Aḫsēri was overthrown by a popular rebellion and was killed along with most of his dynasty by the revolting populace, after which his surviving son Ualli requested help from Assyria, which was provided through the intermediary of Ashurbanipal's relative, the Scythian king Bartatua, after which the Scythians extended their hegemony to Mannai itself.

Around this same time, Bartatua's Scythians were able to take over a significant section of the south-eastern territories of the state of Urartu.

Conquest of Media
Bartatua was succeeded by his son, Madyes, who soon expanded the Scythian hegemony to the state of Urartu.

When, following a period of Assyrian decline over the course of the 650s BC, Esarhaddon's other son, Shamash-shum-ukin, who had succeeded him as the king of Babylon, revolted against his brother Ashurbanipal in 652 BC, the Medes supported him, and Madyes helped Ashurbanipal suppress the revolt externally by invading the Medes. The Median king Phraortes was killed in battle, either against the Assyrians or against Madyes himself, who then imposed Scythian hegemony over the Medes for twenty-eight years on behalf of the Assyrians, thus starting a period which Greek authors called the “Scythian rule over Asia,” with Media, Mannai and Urartu all continuing to exist as kingdoms under Scythian suzerainty.

Defeat of the Cimmerians
During the 7th century BC, the bulk of Cimmerians were operating in Anatolia, where they constituted a threat against the Scythians’ Assyrian allies, who since 669 BC were ruled by Madyes's uncle, that is Esarhaddon's son and Serua-eterat's brother, Ashurbanipal. Assyrian records in 657 BC might have referred to a threat against or a conquest of the western possessions of the Neo-Assyrian Empire in Syria, and these Cimmerian aggressions worried Ashurbanipal about the security of his empire's north-west border. This situation continued throughout the rest of the 650s BC and the early 640s BC.

In 644 BC, the Cimmerians, led by Tugdammi, attacked the kingdom of Lydia, defeated the Lydians and captured the Lydian capital, Sardis; the Lydian king Gyges died during this attack. After sacking Sardis, Tugdammi led the Cimmerians into invading the Greek city-states of Ionia and Aeolis on the western coast of Anatolia. After this attack on Lydia and the Asian Greek cities, around 640 BC the Cimmerians moved to Cilicia on the north-west border of the Neo-Assyrian empire, where, after Tugdammi faced a revolt against himself, he allied with Assyria and acknowledged Assyrian overlordship, and sent tribute to Ashurbanipal, to whom he swore an oath. Tugdammi soon broke this oath and attacked the Neo-Assyrian Empire again, but he fell ill and died in 640 BC, and was succeeded by his son Sandakšatru.

In 637 BC, the Thracian Treres tribe who had migrated across the Thracian Bosporus and invaded Anatolia, under their king Kōbos and in alliance with Sandakšatru's Cimmerians and the Lycians, attacked Lydia during the seventh year of the reign of Gyges's son Ardys. They defeated the Lydians and captured their capital of Sardis except for its citadel, and Ardys might have been killed in this attack. Ardys's son and successor, Sadyattes, might possibly also have been killed in another Cimmerian attack on Lydia in 635 BC.

Soon after 635 BC, with Assyrian approval and in alliance with the Lydians, the Scythians under Madyes entered Anatolia, expelled the Treres from Asia Minor, and defeated the Cimmerians so that they no longer constituted a threat again, following which the Scythians extended their domination to Central Anatolia. This final defeat of the Cimmerians was carried out by the joint forces of Madyes, who Strabo credits with expelling the Cimmerians from Asia Minor, and of the son of Sadyattes and the great-grandson of Gyges, the Lydian king Alyattes, whom Herodotus of Halicarnassus and Polyaenus claim finally defeated the Cimmerians.

Scythian power in West Asia thus reached its peak under Madyes, with the territories ruled by the Scythians extending from the Halys river in Anatolia in the west to the Caspian Sea and the eastern borders of Media in the east, and from Transcaucasia in the north to the northern borders of the Neo-Assyrian Empire in the south.

Revolt of Media
By the 620s BC, the Neo-Assyrian Empire began unravelling after the death of Ashurbanipal in 631 BC: in addition to internal instability within Assyria itself, Babylon revolted against the Assyrians in 626 BC under the leadership of Nabopolassar; and the next year, in 625 BC, Cyaxares, the son of Phraortes and his successor to the Median kingship, overthrew the Scythian yoke over the Medes by inviting the Scythian rulers to a banquet and then murdering them all, including Madyes, after getting them drunk.

Raid till Egypt
Madyes's relationship with the Scythian kings after him and the identity of his successor are both unknown, although the historian and anthropologist Anatoly Khazanov suggests that the Scythians had been ruled by the same dynasty from the time of their stay in West Asia until the end of their kingdom in the Pontic steppe, and that Madyes and the later Scythian kings Spargapeithes and Ariapeithes belonged to the same dynasty, while the scholars Mikhail Bukharin and Askold Ivantchik instead consider Madyes, Spargapeithes, and Ariapeithes to have each belonged to a different dynasty.

Shortly after Madyes's assassination, some time between 623 and 616 BC, the Scythians took advantage of the power vacuum created by the crumbling of the power of their former Assyrian allies and overran the Levant. This Scythian raid into the Levant reached as far south as Palestine, and was foretold by the Judahite prophets Jeremiah and Zephaniah as a pending "disaster from the north," which they believed would result in the destruction of Jerusalem, but Jeremiah was discredited and in consequence temporarily stopped prophesying and lost favour with the Judahite king Josiah when the Scythian raid did not affect Jerusalem and or Judah. The Scythian expedition instead reached up to the borders of Egypt, where their advance was stopped by the marshes of the Nile Delta, after which the pharaoh Psamtik I met them and convinced them to turn back by offering them gifts.

End
According to Babylonian records, around 615 BC the Scythians were operating as allies of Cyaxares and the Medes in their war against Assyria. The Scythians were finally expelled from West Asia by the Medes in the 600s BC, after which they retreated into the Pontic Steppe.

Some splinter Scythian groups nevertheless remained in West Asia and settled in Transcaucasia and the area corresponding to modern-day Azerbaijan. One such splinter group joined the Medes and participated in the Median conquest of Urartu, while other Transcaucasian Scythian splinter groups retreated northwards to join the West Asian Scythians who had already moved into the Kuban Steppe previously.

By the middle of the 6th century BC, the Scythians who had remained in West Asia had completely assimilated culturally and politically into Median society and no longer existed as a distinct group.

Aftermath
After their expulsion from West Asia, and beginning in the later 7th and lasting throughout much of the 6th century BC, the majority of the Scythians migrated from Ciscaucasia into the Pontic Steppe, which became the centre of Scythian power.

Impact
The inroads of the Cimmerians and the Scythians into West Asia over the course of the 8th to 6th centuries BC had destabilised the political balance which had prevailed in the region between the states of Assyria, Urartu, Mannaea and Elam on one side and the mountain and tribal peoples on the other, resulting in the destruction of these former kingdoms and their replacement by new powers, including the kingdoms of the Medes and of the Lydians.

The Scythians adopted many elements of the cultures of the populations of Urartu and Transcaucasia, especially of more effective weapons: the  sword and socketed bronze arrowheads with three edges, which, although they are considered as typically "Scythian weapons," were in fact of Transcaucasian origin and had been adopted by the Scythians during their stay in the Caucasus.

The art typical of the Scythians proper originated between 650 and 600 BC for the needs of the Royal Scythians at the time when they ruled over large swathes of West Asia, with the objects of the Ziwiye hoard being the first example of this art. This art style was initially restricted to the Scythian upper classes, and the Scythian lower classes in both West Asia and the Pontic steppe had not yet adopted it, with the latter group's bone cheek-pieces and bronze buckles being plain and without decorations, while the Pontic group were still using Srubnaya- and Andronovo-type geometric patterns.

Within the Scythian religion, the goddess Artimpasa and the Snake-Legged Goddess were significantly influenced by the Mesopotamian and Syro-Canaanite religions, and respectively absorbed elements from Astarte-Ishtar-Aphrodite for Artimpasa and from Atargatis-Derceto for the Snake-Legged Goddess.

Legacy
The marital alliance between the Scythian king and the Assyrian ruling dynasty, as well as the proximity with Mannai and Urartu placed the Scythians under the strong influence of Assyrian culture, and contact with the civilisation of West Asia would have an important influence on the formation of Scythian culture. Among the concepts initially foreign to the Scythians which they had adopted from the Mesopotamias and Transcaucasian peoples was that of the divine origin of royal power, as well as the practice of performing human sacrifices during royal funerals, and the Scythian kings henceforth imitated the style of rulership of the West Asian kings.

Since Scythian archery techniques and equipment were superior to the traditional ones of the West Asian peoples, the Medes adopted these from the Scythians, and the trade of silk to western Eurasia might have started through the intermediary of the Scythians during their stay in West Asia, with the earliest presence of silk in this part of the world having been found in an Urartian fortress, presumably imported from China through the intermediary of the Scythians.

Genealogy of the kings of Iškuza

References

Sources

 
 
 

 
 
 
 
 
 
 

 
 

Near East in classical antiquity
Scythians
Ancient history of the Caucasus